The Men's 1500 metre Freestyle event at the 10th FINA World Aquatics Championships swam on July 26–27, 2003 in Barcelona, Spain. Preliminary heats swam in the morning session on July 26, with the top-8 finishers advancing to swim again in the Final during the evening session on July 27.

Prior to the start of the event, the existing World (WR) and Championship (CR) records were both:
WR & CR: 14:34.56 swum by Grant Hackett (Australia) on July 29, 2001 in Fukuoka, Japan

Results

Final

Preliminaries

References

Swimming at the 2003 World Aquatics Championships